Birobidzhan (Birobidzhan) is a town and the administrative center of the Jewish Autonomous Oblast, Russia, located on the Trans-Siberian Railway, near the China–Russia border. As of the 2010 Census, its population is 75,413, and its official language is Yiddish. Birobidzhan is named after the two largest rivers in the autonomous oblast: the Bira and the Bidzhan. The Bira, which lies to the east of the Bidzhan Valley, flows through the town. Both rivers are tributaries of the Amur.

History
Birobidzhan was planned by the Swiss architect Hannes Meyer, and established in 1931. It became the administrative center of the Jewish Autonomous Oblast in 1934, and town status was granted to it in 1937. The 36,000 km2 of Birobidzhan were approved by the Politburo on March 28, 1928. After the Bolshevik revolution, the Soviet Union contained two organizations that worked with the Jews settling into Birobidzhan, the KOMZET and OZET. The organizations were responsible for distribution of land as well as domestic responsibilities, ranging from moving to medical assistance. Many Jewish Canadians then gave their support to the Soviet Union by becoming either members or sympathizers with the Communist Party of Canada.

Jewish communists believed that the Soviet Union's creation of Birobidzhan was the "only true and sensible solution to the national question." The Soviet government used the slogan "To the Jewish Homeland!" to encourage Jewish workers to move to Birobidzhan. The slogan proved successful in convincing Soviet Jews as well as Jews from other countries. In 1935, Ambijan received permission from the Soviet government to aid Jewish families traveling to Birobidzhan from Poland, Romania, Lithuania and Germany. Jewish workers and engineers traveled to Birobidzhan from Argentina and the United States as well. This campaign by the Soviet government was known as the Birobidzhan Experiment.

Factors behind the Birobidzhan Experiment
Although Birobidzhan was meant to serve as a home for the Jewish population, the idea struggled to become reality. There were no important cultural connections between the land and the Jewish settlers. The growing population was culturally diverse, with some settlers focused on being modern Russian citizens, some disillusioned by modern cultures with a desire to work the land and promote socialist ideals, with few interested in establishing a cultural homeland. Ulterior motives generated by the Soviet government were the primary reasons for the Jewish relocation to Birobidzhan. They were strategically relocated from their native areas of Ukraine, Belarus, and Crimea as Jewish settlement of these regions was highly resisted by the majority population. The placement of the Jews in Birobidzhan was meant to serve as a buffer to dissuade any Chinese or Japanese expansion. The region was also a link between the Trans Siberian Railroad and the Amur River Valley, and the Soviet government sought to exploit the natural resources of the area, such as fish, timber, iron, tin, and gold.

Complications during the Experiment
Before the Russian Revolution of 1917, residence of Jews was restricted to the Pale of Settlement. As Jews relocated to Birobidzhan, they had to compete with the approximately 27,000 Russians, Cossacks, Koreans, and Ukrainians already residing there for property and land to develop new homes. This complicated the transition for the Jewish population, as there was no significant area to claim as their own.

Logistically and practically, settling Birobidzhan proved to be difficult. Due to inadequate infrastructure and weather conditions of the area, more than half the Jewish settlers who relocated to Birobidzhan after the initial settlement did not remain.

When the Stalinist purges began, shortly after the creation of Birobidzhan, Jews there were targeted. Following World War II, tens of thousands of displaced Eastern European Jews found their way to Birobidzhan from 1946 to 1948. Some were Ukrainian and Belarusian Jews who were not allowed to return to their original homes. However, Jews were once again targeted in the wake of World War II when Joseph Stalin embarked on a campaign against "rootless cosmopolitans". Nearly all the Yiddish institutions of Birobidzhan were liquidated.

Notable supporters of Birobidzhan

Among Birobidzhan's proponents was Dudley Aman, 1st Baron Marley. After Lord Marley met with Peter Smidovich and Jacob Tsegelnitski in August 1932, Marley became a proponent of Birobidzhan as a new homeland for Jewish workers and refugees. His visit to Birobidzhan in October 1933 was organized by Smidovich himself. Marley's assessment of the area was positive, and he became a more avid supporter of the settlement of Birobidzhan.

Yiddish writer David Bergelson played a large part in promoting Birobidzhan, although he himself did not really live there. Bergelson wrote articles in the Yiddish language newspapers in other countries extolling the region as an ideal escape from anti-Semitism elsewhere. At least 1,000 families from the United States and Latin America came to Birobidzhan because of Bergelson. On his 68th birthday in 1952, Bergelson was among those executed during Stalin's antisemitic campaign against "rootless cosmopolitans" following the establishment of the state of Israel in 1948.

In the Russian language play Novaia rodina (New Homeland) by the Soviet playwright Victor Fink celebrated Birobidzhan as the coming together of three communities-the Koreans, the Amur Cossacks and the Jews. Each community has its own good and bad characters, but ultimately the good characters from each community learn to co-operate and work with each other. To symbolize the unity achieved, the play ends with mixed marriages with one Jewish character marrying a Korean, another Jewish character marrying a Cossack and a Cossack marrying a Korean. Likewise, the Soviet Yiddish writer Emmanuil Kazakevich portrayed in a poem the achievement of Birobidzhan being declared the Jewish Autonomous Region on 7 May 1934 as an inter-communal event with the members of the Amur Cossack Host coming out to join the celebrations. Kazkevich's poem had a basis in reality-many members of the Amur Cossack Host hoped that Birobidzhan signalled Soviet interest in the neglected region along the banks of the Amur river.

Canadian Arctic explorer Vilhjalmur Stefansson was vice president of Ambijan, or the American Committee for the Settlement of Jews in Birobidjan, which was a supplementary group that was combined with ICOR in 1946. His support of Birobidzhan as a new homeland for Jewish families consisted of appearing at meetings in support of the relocation of Jews to Birobidzhan as well as advocating for families who truly wished to travel rather than those who were the most fit for the journey.

Jewish and Yiddish culture

The Russian Empire had the largest Jewish population in the world in the 19th and early 20th centuries and the majority of them were Ashkenazi Jews. Large numbers of them remained even after 2 million of them departed for other countries prior to the formation of the Soviet Union. While thousands of Jews migrated to Birobidzhan, the hardship and isolation caused most to leave. In 1939 the Jewish population made up less than twenty percent of the overall population. Shortly after World War II, the Jewish population in the region reached its peak of about 30,000. As of the mid-2010s, only about 2,000 Jews remain in the region, making up about one half of a percent of the population.

Yiddish, at that time widely regarded as the lingua franca of the Jewish community, was meant to help integrate the Jewish population into the Soviet population. The language would ensure 'national in form, socialist in content' was being followed by the Soviet Jewry. Many government officials in the Kremlin were under the impression that Birobidzhan was to become the new center for Soviet Jewish life, which is why Jewish migration to Birobidzhan was strongly pushed during the 1920s.

The Jewish religious community in Birobidzhan was officially registered in 1946. The religious community suffered persecution in the early 1950s. Jewish culture was revived in Birobidzhan much earlier than elsewhere in the Soviet Union. Yiddish theaters opened in the 1970s. Yiddish and Jewish traditions have been required components in all public schools for almost fifteen years, taught not as Jewish exotica but as part of the region's national heritage. The orthodox synagogue, completed in 2004, is next to a complex housing Sunday School classrooms, a library, a museum, and administrative offices. The buildings were officially opened in 2004 to mark the 70th anniversary of the founding of the Jewish Autonomous Oblast.

According to Israeli Rabbi Mordechai Scheiner, the former Chief Rabbi of Birobidzhan and Chabad Lubavitch representative to the region, "Today one can enjoy the benefits of the Yiddish culture and not be afraid to return to their Jewish traditions. It's safe without any anti-Semitism, and we plan to open the first Jewish day school here." Scheiner also hosted the Russian television show, Yiddishkeit in the region.  His student, actually born in Birobidzhan, Rabbi Eliyahu Riss, has taken over the reins since 2010.

The orthodox synagogue opened in 2004. Rabbi Scheiner says there are 4,000 Jews in Birobidzhan, just over 5 percent of the town's population of 75,000. The Birobidzhan Jewish community was led by Lev Toitman, until his death in September, 2007.

Concerning the Jewish community of the oblast, Governor Nikolay Mikhaylovich Volkov has stated that he intends to "support every valuable initiative maintained by our local Jewish organizations". In 2007, the Birobidzhan International Summer Program for Yiddish Language and Culture was launched by Yiddish studies professor Boris Kotlerman of Bar-Ilan University. The town's main street is named after the Yiddish language author and humorist Sholom Aleichem.

For the Chanukah celebration of 2007, officials of Birobidzhan in the Jewish Autonomous Oblast claimed to have built the world's largest menorah. A November 2017 article in The Guardian, titled, "Revival of a Soviet Zion: Birobidzhan celebrates its Jewish heritage", examined the current status of the city and suggested that, even though the Jewish Autonomous Region in Russia's far east is now barely 1% Jewish, officials hope to woo back people who left after Soviet collapse.

Rabbi Eli Riss has set out to return the Jewish culture to the Jewish Autonomous Oblast. The current slogan is "make Birobidzhan Jewish again". The people want this to include teaching Yiddish in the school systems again as well as celebrating the variety of Jewish holidays. Riss' parents were originally residents of Birobidzhan, but moved to Israel in the 90's along with a large majority of the Jewish population from the Oblast. He came back as the Chief Rabbi with plans of reinvigorating the Jewish culture. There are already plans for a kosher restaurant, supermarket, and mikveh. Riss is trying to make Birobidzhan a 'safe place for Jews' and has already stated that it is one of the few places he has been where he has not experienced any anti-semitism.

Administrative and municipal status
Birobidzhan is the administrative center of the autonomous oblast and, within the framework of administrative divisions, it also serves as the administrative center of Birobidzhansky District, even though it is not a part of it. As an administrative division, it is incorporated separately as the town of oblast significance of Birobidzhan—an administrative unit with the status equal to that of the districts. As a municipal division, the town of oblast significance of Birobidzhan is incorporated as Birobidzhan Urban Okrug.

Economy, infrastructure and transportation
The chief economic activity is light industry, including textile and footwear. The city also has a vehicle repair factory, a furniture factory, a quicklime production factory, and several foodstuff factories. Khabarovsk is the closest major city to Birobidzhan and provides the closest major airport access to it, which is Khabarovsk Novy Airport (KHV / UHHH), 198 km from the center of Birobidzhan.

Education
The Sholem Aleichem Amur State University works in cooperation with the local religious community. The university is unique in the Russian Far East. The basis of the training course is study of the Hebrew language, history and classic Jewish texts. The town now boasts several state-run schools that teach Yiddish, as well as an Anglo-Yiddish faculty at its higher education college, a Yiddish school for religious instruction and a kindergarten. The five- to seven-year-olds spend two lessons a week learning to speak Yiddish, as well as being taught Jewish songs, dance and traditions. It is a public school that offers a half-day Yiddish and Jewish curriculum for those parents who choose it. About half the school's 120 pupils are enrolled in the Yiddish course. Many of them continue on to Public School No. 2, which offers the same half-day Yiddish/Jewish curriculum from first through 12th grade. Yiddish is also offered at Birobidzhan's Pedagogical Institute, one of the only university-level Yiddish courses in the country. Today, the town's fourteen public schools must teach Yiddish and Jewish tradition.

Geography

Climate
Birobidzhan experiences a harsh, monsoon-influenced humid continental climate (Köppen climate classification Dwb) that is typified by very large seasonal temperature differences, with warm to hot (and often humid) summers and severely cold (and dry) winters.

Sports
The bandy club Nadezhda has been playing in the 2nd highest division, the Russian Bandy Supreme League, until the 2016–17 season. However, in 2017–18 the team did not play in the league.

Twin towns – sister cities

Birobidzhan is twinned with:

 Beaverton, OR, United States
 Niigata, Japan
 Hegang, China
 Yichun, China
 Ma'alot-Tarshiha, Israel
 Nof HaGalil, Israel

Notable people
 Nataliya Gumenyuk, journalist, teacher

See also
In Search of Happiness, a documentary about modern-day Birobidzhan
Organization for Jewish Colonization in the Soviet Union (IKOR)
History of the Jews in the Jewish Autonomous Oblast
New Jerusalem
Beit T'shuva
Boris "Dov" Kaufman
Yoel Razvozov, an Israeli judoka and member of Parliament, born in Birobidzhan

References

Notes

Sources

Further reading
S. Almazov, 10 Years of Biro-Bidjan. New York: ICOR, 1938.
Henry Frankel, The Jews in the Soviet Union and Birobidjan. New York: American Birobidjan Committee, 1946.

Nora Levin, The Jews in the Soviet Union Since 1917: Paradox of Survival: Volume 1. New York: New York University Press, 1988.
James N. Rosenberg, How the Back-to-the-Soil Movement Began: Two Years of Blazing the New Jewish "Covered Wagon" Trail Across the Russian Prairies. Philadelphia: United Jewish Campaign, 1925.
Jeffrey Shandler, "Imagining Yiddishland: Language, Place and Memory," History and Memory, vol. 15, no. 1 (Spring/Summer 2003), pp. 123–149. In JSTOR
Henry Felix Srebrnik, Dreams of Nationhood: American Jewish Communists and the Soviet Birobidzhan Project, 1924-1951. Boston: Academic Studies Press, 2010.
Robert Weinberg, "Purge and Politics in the Periphery: Birobidzhan in 1937," Slavic Review, vol. 52, no. 1 (Spring 1993), pp. 13–27. In JSTOR
Robert Weinberg, Stalin's Forgotten Zion: Birobidzhan and the Making of a Soviet Jewish Homeland: An Illustrated History, 1928-1996. Berkeley, CA: University of California Press, 1998.

External links
Official website of Birobizhan  
Birobidzhan Business Directory 
Photos of Birobidzhan
Song about Birobidzhan
'Sad And Absurd': The U.S.S.R.'s Disastrous Effort To Create A Jewish Homeland (National Public Radio on September 7, 2016)
"Birobidzhan Jewish autonomous region" (RT, 2009)
 ‘We never know if we are really accepted, or if we are playing a role', Mati Shemoelof interview in April 2021 with the Israeli-Berliner writer who wrote a novel on Birobidzhan, Plus61J

 
Cities and towns in the Jewish Autonomous Oblast
Russian Far East
Populated places established in 1931
Historic Jewish communities in Asia
Yiddish culture in Russia
1931 establishments in the Soviet Union